Pioneer Corps may refer to:

 Indian Army Pioneer Corps
 Royal Pioneer Corps
 Pioneer movement, an organization for children operated by a communist party.